British Gurkhas Nepal (BGN) is an administrative organisation of the British Army.

History
Following generations of territorial disputes between the successors of Prithvi Narayan Shah, Leader of the Gorkha Kingdom, and the East India Company a peace treaty was signed in 1816 which allowed Nepalese nationals to volunteer for service in the East India Company's Army. BGN fell under the responsibility of HQ 4th Division in Aldershot in 2011 when Support Command (now Regional Command) took over that role.

Operations
The mission of BGN is to deliver Gurkha recruitment, provide local support to the soldier and ex-servicemen and maintain Disaster Relief preparedness within resources in order to support Firm Base activity in Nepal.

BGN is commanded by a full colonel, who also serves as the defence attaché at the British Embassy in Kathmandu, and operates from three locations within Nepal:

Jawalakhel, Patan - just south of the river from central Kathmandu is the location both of Headquarters British Gurkhas Nepal and the Kathmandu station, which is the focal point for organisation of transit to and from Nepal, the welfare of serving soldiers and payment of pensions.
The British Gurkha Camp in Pokhara is the main recruitment centre, where the annual selection course is run. Pokhara is also the location of the main pension records and houses the headquarters of the Gurkha Welfare Trust.
British Gurkha Dharan is a small station intended to assist BGN operations in eastern Nepal. It is used primarily as a movement base and regional recruiting centre.

References

External links 
 British Gurkhas Nepal - on British Army official website

Brigade of Gurkhas
Gurkhas
Nepal–United Kingdom military relations
Military installations of the United Kingdom in other countries